"Tony and the Beetles" is a science fiction short story by American writer Philip K. Dick, first published in Orbit Science Fiction, No.2, in 1953. 

The story is told from the point of view of a young boy, Tony, living on an alien world that humans have conquered. The native species are beetle like creatures called the Pas-udenti, some of whom Tony has befriended. As news reaches the planet that the war has turned against the humans, Tony attempts to carry on his daily life, to disastrous effect.

External links
Page at Internet Speculative Fiction Database
 

Short stories by Philip K. Dick
1953 short stories